William Burley may refer to:
 William Burley (politician)
 William Burley (priest)
 William Burley (footballer)
 W. J. Burley (William John Burley), British crime writer